Feast of the Gods is a 2012 South Korean television series, starring Sung Yu-ri, Seo Hyun-jin, Joo Sang-wook and Lee Sang-woo. The series follows the fate of two girls whose identities were switched and later become rival chefs of traditional royal cuisine. It aired on MBC from February 4 to May 20, 2012 on Saturdays and Sundays at 21:50 for 32 episodes.

Plot
At the center of the drama is Arirang, a renowned restaurant that specializes in royal Korean cuisine. For generations, Arirang has chosen only the most expert and gifted chefs to continue its heritage of making traditional Korean food. When Sung Do-hee (Jeon In-hwa) is appointed the next successor, rival Baek Seol-hee (Kim Bo-yeon) will stop at nothing to claim her stake on the restaurant. The forces of greed and jealousy drive both women to risk family and happiness until unimaginable tragedy and loss strike both of their lives.

Several years later, Arirang is looking for a new successor. The hard-working and provincial Go Joon-young (Sung Yu-ri) becomes an unlikely candidate for the institution's next seat of power. However, Ha In-joo (Seo Hyun-jin), the daughter of Sung Do-hee, is determined to fill her mother's shoes. Joon-young and In-joo, it turns out, share more than just a desire to master Korean cuisine—their pasts, their loves, and who their identities are tangled in a breathtaking, tragic, and triumphant drama about what it means to preserve truth and integrity in the midst of lies and corruption.

Cast
Sung Yu-ri as Go Joon-young
Jung Min-ah as young Joon-young
Seo Hyun-jin as Ha In-joo / Song Yeon-woo
Joo Da-young as young In-joo
Joo Sang-wook as Choi Jae-ha
Lee Sang-woo as Kim Do-yoon 
Jeon In-hwa as Sung Do-hee
Kim Bo-yeon as Baek Seol-hee
Jung Hye-sun as Sun Noh-in
Jung Dong-hwan as Ha Young-bum
Jin Tae-hyun as Ha In-woo
Park Sang-myun as Im Do-shik
Seo Yi-sook as No Young-sim
Sean Richard Dulake as Daniel
Son Hwa-ryung as Kim Shin-young
Yeon Min-ji as Jane

Ratings

Awards and nominations

International broadcast
 At the 18th Shanghai Television Festival in June 2012, the broadcast rights of the show were sold to Thailand.
 It aired in Vietnam on VTV6 beginning March 18, 2013, under the name Bữa tiệc của các vị thần.
 It aired in Thailand on Channel 3 Family beginning January 2, 2015.

References

External links
Feast of the Gods official MBC website 
Feast of the Gods at MBC Global Media

South Korean cooking television series
2012 South Korean television series debuts
2012 South Korean television series endings
Korean-language television shows
MBC TV television dramas
South Korean romantic comedy television series